Longipenis dentivalvus is a moth in the family Lecithoceridae. It is found in Guangdong, China.

The wingspan is 29–30 mm. The forewings are dark brown with purplish and with a yellow spot at three quarters of the costal margin. The hindwings are brownish black and wider than the forewings.

Etymology
The species name is derived from the Latin dent and valva and refers to the costa of the valva with a median dentiform (tooth shaped) projection.

References

Moths described in 2010
Lecithoceridae